Aparnaa World School is a CBSE affiliated, English Medium, day cum residential school established in 2014, situated in Jharsuguda, Odisha. The school operated from Nursery to Class XII. The school is now an Indian Boarding School. As of 2021 the school has enrolled 600 students, with a teacher student ratio of 1:15. The school occupies a 18-acre lush green campus.

History 
Aparnaa World School was founded by Mr. Ajay Kumar Poddar of Jharsuguda in 2014, as the chairman of the school. It was meant exclusively for academics. It is carried forward with the aim of educating students and making bringing them a step closer for being world leaders. It is now headed by Mr. Ateek Poddar.

In the city of Jharsuguda, there exists the Preprimary Campus of the school. The main campus of the school is located at the junction of four districts - Sundargarh, Sambalpur, Raigarh and Jharsuguda. Aparnaa World School has now opened up one more branch in Laikera. Aparnaa World School is ranked the best school in Western Odisha for its amazing infrastructure and faculty.

Student life 
The school is built on 18 acres. It is filled with an environment which motivates to excel.

The school has classes from Nursery to 12th. It is believed to give the best results for students every year. The school has also started preparing students for NEET/JEE entrance examinations.

Hostels 
The school is in built in a Village concept (It takes a village to raise a child), and is built horizontally. The school building do not go more than 3 floors. There are 3 Prime Buildings and  the teachers live in the residential quarters.

The school is divided into 4 houses, Atulya, Abhaya, Ajaya and Akshaya

The buildings have rooms and the junior students are looked after by housemistresses, matrons and other domestic staff. The senior students have a housemaster and a resident tutor along with the domestic staff. The housemaster's residence and that of another faculty member are attached to each house to ensure the availability of pastoral guidance.

Activities 
Extracurricular activities are organised by students and supervised by faculty. The school has Junior and Senior Debating Society teams and two literary societies — one for English and one for Sanskrit and Hindi.  The School Council, composed of elected students teachers, give students a large degree of self-government.

Students take up hobbies like music, photography, painting, glass painting, batik dying, papier-mâché, clay modelling, pottery, stone carving, wood work and metal work. They are encouraged to learn first aid, automobile mechanics and to develop an interest in Information Technology. Students participate in educational camps, nature camps, adventure activities — outdoor survival, mountaineering expeditions, are few of many examples.

Sports 
Students participate in sports including track & field athletics, soccer, cricket, basketball, skating, horse riding, archery, rifle shooting, boxing, badminton, swimming  and more. A large multi-purpose gym serves the students in their indoor sporting pursuits.

End Word 
The Aparnaa World School, Jharsuguda, Odisha gives students career counseling, guidance, advice and many more to help the students achieve their career goals. All our teaching and non-teaching staff is enthusiastic about helping students to achieve their individual potential and set their career goals high.

References

 "Complete Information Form". cbseaff.nic.in.
 Website
 Branches - Aparnaa Gurukul School & Aparnaa Junior School

External links

Schools in Odisha
2014 establishments in Odisha
Educational institutions established in 2014